Robert Martin Schang (December 7, 1886 – August 29, 1966), born in Wales Center, New York, was a catcher for the Pittsburgh Pirates (1914–15), New York Giants (1915) and St. Louis Cardinals (1927).

He was the brother of former Major League Baseball catcher Wally Schang.

In 3 seasons Schang played in 82 Games and had 186 At Bats, 14 Runs, 35 Hits, 7 Doubles, 4 Triples, 6 RBI, 3 Stolen Bases, 18 Walks, .188 Batting Average, .263 On-base percentage, .269 Slugging Percentage, 50 Total Bases and 8 Sacrifice Hits.

He died in Sacramento, California at the age of 79.

Sources

1886 births
1966 deaths
Baseball players from New York (state)
Major League Baseball catchers
Pittsburgh Pirates players
New York Giants (NL) players
St. Louis Cardinals players
Minor league baseball managers
Erie Sailors players
St. Joseph Drummers players
Indianapolis Indians players
Seattle Rainiers players
Sacramento Senators players
Frederick Hustlers players
Vernon Tigers players
Houston Buffaloes players
Danville Veterans players
Syracuse Stars (minor league baseball) players
Dayton Aviators players
Laurel Cardinals players